Elizabeth George is an American author of mystery novels set in Great Britain.

Elizabeth George may also refer to:

Elizabeth George (author) (born 1944), Christian writer, teacher, and public speaker
Elizabeth George (businesswoman) (1814–1902), New Zealand hotel owner, businesswoman and community leader
Elizabeth Anne George (1935–2012), Australian botanical writer

See also
Elizabeth George Speare (1908–1994), American children's author